The IEEE Robotics and Automation Society (IEEE RAS) is a professional society of the IEEE that supports the development and the exchange of scientific knowledge in the fields of robotics and automation, including applied and theoretical issues.

History 
The initial IEEE Robotics and Automation (R&A) entity, the Robotics and Automation Council, was founded in 1984 by a number of IEEE Societies including Aerospace and Electronic Systems, Circuits and Systems, Components, Hybrids, and Manufacturing Technology, Computers, Control Systems, Industrial Electronics, Industry Applications, and Systems, Man and Cybernetics. In 1987 the council became the IEEE Robotics and Automation Society.

Field of interest 
The Society states in its constitution that it "is interested in both applied and theoretical issues in robotics and automation. Robotics is here defined to include intelligent machines and systems used, for example, in space exploration, human services, or manufacturing; whereas automation includes the use of automated methods in various applications, for example, factory, office, home, or transportation systems to improve performance and productivity."

Publications 

The society publishes a range of peer-reviewed journals, including
IEEE Transactions on Robotics
IEEE Transactions on Automation Science and Engineering
IEEE Robotics and Automation Magazine
IEEE Robotics and Automation Letters

Co-sponsored publications include:
IEEE/ASME MicroElectroMechanical Systems Journal (MEMS)
IEEE/ASME Transactions on Mechatronics
IEEE Transactions on Haptics
IEEE Transactions on Mobile Computing
IEEE Transactions on Nano–Bio Science
IEEE Transactions on Nanotechnology
IEEE Sensors Journal
IEEE Systems Journal

Conferences 
The IEEE Robotics and Automation Society sponsors and co-sponsors a number of annual international conferences such as the International Conference on Robotics and Automation and International Conference on Intelligent Robots and Systems.

References

External links 

IEEE societies